The 1988 Meghalaya Legislative Assembly election was held on 2 February 1988. In the lead up to the election, sporadic violence targeted at the Indian Nepali population of the state occurred. No party secured a majority of seats and two women were elected.

Following the election, on 6 February 1988, the United Meghalaya Parliamentary Democratic Forum coalition was formed between the Indian National Congress (INC), the Hill People's Union (HPU), the All Party Hill Leaders Conference (Armison Marak Group) and independents. Purno A. Sangma (from the INC) was successfully nominated as Chief Minister.

Results

Elected Members

References 

Meghalaya
State Assembly elections in Meghalaya